Monobaatar is a genus of extinct mammal from the Lower Cretaceous of Mongolia. It was within the also extinct order Multituberculata, and lived during the "age of the dinosaurs". It is also within the  suborder "Plagiaulacida" and has been tentatively referred to the family Eobaataridae, though it probably is not a member.

The genus Monobaatar (Kielan-Jaworowska, Dashzeveg & Trofimov, 1987) is known from the species Monobaatar mimicus, which itself is very poorly known. Fossil remains come from the Lower Cretaceous of Mongolia.

References 
 Kielan-Jaworowska et al. (1987), "Early Cretaceous multituberculates from Mongolia and a comparison with Late Jurassic forms." Acta Palaeontologica Polonica, 23(1-2), p. 3-47.
 Kielan-Jaworowska Z. and Hurum J.H. (2001), "Phylogeny and Systematics of multituberculate mammals." Paleontology 44, p. 389-429.
 Much of this information has been derived from  MESOZOIC MAMMALS; Plagiaulacidae, Albionbaataridae, Eobaataridae & Arginbaataridae, an Internet directory.

Multituberculates
Cretaceous mammals
Extinct mammals of Asia
Prehistoric mammal genera